Dennis Smith (1 February 1939 – 30 July 2017) was an Australian rules footballer who played for the Richmond Football Club in the Victorian Football League (VFL).

Notes

External links 
		

1939 births
2017 deaths
Australian rules footballers from Victoria (Australia)
Richmond Football Club players
Myrtleford Football Club players